Newtyle is a village in the west of Angus, Scotland.
The village sits on gently sloping ground with a northwest aspect. The main communication link is the B954 road. The population was about 800 .

History
The original village of Newtyle was centred on the church and what are now Kirkton Road and Smiddy road. Hatton Castle to the south and Newbigging to the north lie within the parish boundary.

The Railway
Newtyle was the northern terminus for the first commercial railway in Scotland, the Dundee and Newtyle Railway which opened in 1831. The grid street plan of the central part of the village was laid out shortly after the railway opened and was intended to form the basis for a manufacturing centre which could take advantage of the communications link to Dundee.
Rail services to and from Newtyle were in decline for a number of years before the line was closed in the 1960s under the Beeching Axe. Most of the railway buildings have since been demolished but the embankments and cuttings remain a prominent feature of the countryside surrounding the village.

Education
Newtyle school provides education at primary level up to year 7 after which pupils travel elsewhere for secondary education. The school provided two years of secondary education until 1998. Local government boundary changes have seen different generations of Newtyle pupils receive their secondary education at Forfar Academy, Harris Academy in Dundee, Monifieth High School and latterly at Webster's High School in Kirriemuir. A new school was constructed in 2009 to replace the old building which had been in use since 1963.

Economy
There are no major employers in Newtyle, but a number of small local businesses also provide employment within the village. A large part of the working population commutes to Dundee.

See also
Hatton Castle
Kinpurnie Castle

Notes

Villages in Angus, Scotland